is a 1976 Japanese war drama film, directed by Tengo Yamada based on the Japanese manga series of the same name. The film is set in 1945 and tells the story of the six-year-old boy Gen Nakaoka, living in Hiroshima around the time of the US atomic bombing of the city.

Plot

Cast
 Kenta Sato as "Gen Nakaoka", Barefoot Gen, the protagonist of the story
 Rentarō Mikuni as "Daikichi Nakaoka", Gen's father
 Sachiko Hodari as "Kimie Nakaoka", Gen's mother
 Yotaro Komatsu as "Koji Nakaoka", Gen's eldest brother
 Chizuko Iwahara as "Eiko Nakaoka", Gen's elder sister
 Yukiya Minoshima as "Akira Nakaoka", Gen's elder brother
 Hirokazu Ishimatsu as "Shinji Nakaoka", Gen's younger brother
 Fumi Soganoya as "Denjiro Samejima"
 Jun Shimada as "Boku-san"
 Shinhei Sakamoto as teacher "Kishi"
 Yuko Oseki as teacher "Osato"
 Sakae Umezu as teacher "Hirose"
 Akira Oizumi as teacher "Numata"
 Shinji Maki as "Horikawa"

Awards
 Best Director, 1976 Karlovy Vary International Film Festival

See also
 Barefoot Gen
 Barefoot Gen (anime)
 Barefoot Gen (TV series)

External links
 

1976 films
Films about the atomic bombings of Hiroshima and Nagasaki
Historical anime and manga
1970s Japanese-language films
Japanese war drama films
Film
Films set in Hiroshima
Films shot in Hiroshima
Japanese World War II films
1970s Japanese films
Live-action films based on manga

ja:はだしのゲン#実写映画